Clapton may refer to:

People
 Clapton (surname)
 Eric Clapton (born 1945), English blues rock guitarist

Places
Clapton, London, an area of East London, closely analogous to the E5 (Clapton) postcode district of the E postcode area divided into Upper Clapton and Lower Clapton
 Clapton, Berkshire, a village in Berkshire
 Clapton, Gloucestershire, an English village
 Clapton, Somerset a hamlet in the parish of Ston Easton
 Clapton, South Somerset a hamlet in the parish of Wayford
 Clapton in Gordano, a village in Somerset, England
 4305 Clapton, an asteroid named after Eric Clapton
 Clapton Stadium, a former greyhound stadium that existed between 1928 and 1974

Music
Multiple albums by blues rock musician Eric Clapton:
Clapton (1973 album), a greatest hits album from Polydor
Clapton (2010 album), a studio album

Other
 Clapton F.C., an English association football club based in Forest Gate, in the London Borough of Newham, since 1877

See also
Clopton (disambiguation)